William Chapple may refer to:

 William Chapple (New Zealand politician) (1864–1936), member of both the New Zealand House of Representatives and the House of Commons of the United Kingdom
 Sir William Chapple (judge) (c. 1676–1745), British lawyer, judge and politician
 William Chapple (surveyor) (1718–1781), English surveyor and mathematician
 William D. Chapple (1868–1956), Massachusetts lawyer and politician

See also
 William Chappell (disambiguation)